Maximilian Nicu (born 25 November 1982) is a former professional footballer who played as a midfielder or centre-back. He spent most of his career in Germany, apart from two short spells in Romania and Cyprus. Born in Germany, he represented the Romania national team internationally, making three appearances in 2009.

Club career

Hertha BSC
Nicu made his first appearance with Hertha BSC on 31 July 2008 in the 2008–09 UEFA Cup first qualifying round second leg against FC Nistru Otaci. He made his Bundesliga debut on 17 August 2008 in Hertha's opening fixture against Eintracht Frankfurt. Nicu came on in the 71st minute as a substitute, replacing Patrick Ebert. After two seasons with Hertha, the club chose not to renew Nicu's contract following their relegation to the 2. Bundesliga.

SC Freiburg
On 1 July 2010, Nicu signed for SC Freiburg.

1860 Munich
On 31 January 2012, Nicu signed for 2. Bundesliga side 1860 Munich.

Universitatea Cluj
On 14 January 2014 he signed a contract with Universitatea Cluj making it the first Romanian club in his career.

Aris Limassol
In July 2014, Maximilian Nicu signed a one-year contract with Cypriot Second Division club Aris Limassol.

SV Elversberg
In January 2015, after a year abroad, he returned to his native Germany and signed for fourth tier Regionalliga Südwest side SV Elversberg until 2016.

SpVgg Unterhaching
In August 2015, Nicu joined SpVgg Unterhaching from Elversberg for a second stint at the club. In April 2018, Unterhaching announced Nicu would retire from professional football at the end of the 2017–18 season.

International career
Nicu elected to play for the country of his parents, rather than his country of birth. In 2009, he requested a Romanian passport. Nicu was called up for matches against Serbia and Austria. At first it appeared he would not be able to play, since he had not received his Romanian citizenship yet, but on 17 March it was announced that Nicu had been granted citizenship and would be permitted to play.

On 20 March 2009, he pledged his vow to become a Romanian citizen. He made his debut for Romania on 1 April 2009 against Austria.

Career statistics

Club

International

Honours
SpVgg Unterhaching
Regionalliga Süd: 2002–03

Individual
Regionalliga Süd top scorer: 2005–06 (16 goals)

References

External links
 
 
 
 
 Maximilian Nicu Interview

1982 births
Living people
People from Rosenheim (district)
Sportspeople from Upper Bavaria
German people of Romanian descent
Romanian footballers
German footballers
Association football midfielders
Romania international footballers
Romanian expatriate footballers
Expatriate footballers in Germany
Romanian expatriate sportspeople in Germany
Expatriate footballers in Cyprus
Romanian expatriate sportspeople in Cyprus
SpVgg Unterhaching players
FC Rot-Weiß Erfurt players
SV Wehen Wiesbaden players
SV Wacker Burghausen players
Hertha BSC players
SC Freiburg players
TSV 1860 Munich players
FC Universitatea Cluj players
Aris Limassol FC players
Bundesliga players
2. Bundesliga players
Regionalliga players
Liga I players
Cypriot Second Division players
3. Liga players
Footballers from Bavaria